Kvinnornas Andelsförening Svenska Hem (literally: Women's Cooperative Society Swedish Home) or commonly just Svenska Hem (Swedish Home) was a Swedish food cooperative, founded in 1905 and merged with the Kooperativa Förbundet in 1916. During its time of existence, it was for a time the biggest food cooperative in Sweden, with five groceries and 3,300 members.

Life
It was founded by Anna Whitlock and Ina Almén as an effort to ensure good quality of the food in the city's groceries. At the time it was not uncommon for grocers to mask bad food by such means as mixing chalk into sugar.

The cooperative was met with resistance and a boycott by the Stockholm Grocery Society, but survived and enjoyed success. It had 3300 female cooperative members, many of whom were famous such as Selma Lagerlöf, Ellen Key, Emilia Broomé, Anna Branting, Elin Wägner, Karolina Widerström, Hanna Pauli, Karin Larsson and Harriet Bosse.

In 1915, Nordiska Kompaniet was founded and Svenska Hem was not able to defeat the competition. It merged with the Kooperativa Förbundet in 1916.

Fiction
The story of the Svenska Hem-cooperative was portrayed in the series Fröken Frimans krig (2013), with Anna Whitlock renamed Dagmar Friman and played by Sissela Kyle.

References

1905 in Sweden
1916 in Sweden
Cooperatives in Sweden
Women in Sweden
Women's organizations based in Sweden